Minervino Alejandro "Minnie" Rojas Landin (November 26, 1933 – March 23, 2002) was a right-handed relief pitcher in Major League Baseball (MLB) who played for the California Angels from  through  after many seasons pitching in Mexican semi-pro leagues, the Mexican League, and the minor leagues. He debuted as a 32 year old rookie starting pitcher for the Angels in  but would only make one additional start for the remainder of his major league career. Instead, he became a valuable member of the Angels' bullpen at a time when the role of relief pitchers was evolving in the professional game. In , Rojas pitched briefly in the minor leagues and the Mexican League in an attempt to regain his form, but lingering arm issues led him to retire from baseball without returning to the majors.

In 1970, Rojas and his family were involved in a serious automobile accident that killed two of his three children and left him partially paralyzed for the rest of his life. The California Angels organization and players held fund-raisers to help their former teammate, including organizing "Minnie Rojas Day" in 1971.

Baseball career

Minor leagues / Mexican League 
Rojas was born in Remedios, Villa Clara, Cuba. He showed promise as a baseball player in his youth, and after a year of compulsory military service, he left his native country to play semi-pro baseball in Mexico. In 1960, he signed a minor league contract with the San Francisco Giants. The Giants did not promote him to the majors after 4 years in their minor league system, so Rojas signed a free agent contract with the independent Jalisco Charros of the Mexican League in 1964.

In 1965, Rojas won 21 games as a starting pitcher for Jalisco, attracting the attention of the California Angels. The Angels bought his contract for $2500 and sent him to their AAA affiliate, the Seattle Rainiers, to begin the 1966 season. He was effective as both a starter and reliever against minor league competition, leading the Angels to call him up to the majors in late May.

California Angels 
Rojas made his major league debut on May 30, 1966, when he started a game against the Cleveland Indians and earned the win. Rojas would only make one additional start in the majors, instead becoming an effective bullpen arm. He appeared in 47 games and earned 10 saves as a 32-year-old rookie.

In 1967, Rojas became the Angels' closer and led the American League with 27 saves, setting a franchise record that wasn't broken until Donnie Moore collected 31 saves in 1985. Rojas also won 12 games in relief that year and was a major reason that the Angels were surprising contenders for the American League pennant until mid-September. He was named the American League's Fireman of the Year and was 24th in the voting for American League MVP.

During the 1968 season, Rojas developed calcium deposits and tendonitis in his elbow, probably due to overwork during the many seasons leading up to his major league debut. He was placed on the disabled list in late July and was eventually shut down for the 1968 season without throwing another pitch.

Rojas attempted to resume his career in 1969 and threw 18 innings of minor league ball, but his "arm trouble" continued, and he retired from baseball at the age of 35.

Scouting report
Rojas' pitching repertoire consisted mainly of breaking balls, changeups, and a sinking fastball. "He's got three pitches", one opposing batter commented, "slow, slower, and 'come and get it'." Despite his lack of a high-velocity pitch, Rojas was effective during his short MLB career due to excellent command and pitch movement. He posted a 23–16 record with a 3.00 ERA and 43 saves in 157 appearances, allowing only 45 unintentional walks in 261 innings over parts of three seasons.

Accident
Around midnight on March 31, 1970, the Rojas family's station wagon was involved in a serious hit and run auto accident near Key Largo on the Overseas Highway after a fishing trip in the Florida Keys. Rojas' spinal cord was damaged, leaving him partially paralyzed, and his two young daughters, Lourdes and Barbara, were killed. His wife, Maria, and his infant son survived.

The Angels organization, led by team shortstop and Rojas' friend Jim Fregosi, started a fund to help Rojas and his surviving family. The team also held "Minnie Rojas Day" during a spring training exhibition game at Anaheim Stadium in March 1971 and donated the proceeds to the Rojas family. Through intense physical therapy, Rojas eventually regained some use of his upper body, but he would not walk again

Rojas died in Los Angeles on March 23, 2002, at the age of 68.

See also
 List of Major League Baseball players from Cuba
 List of Major League Baseball annual saves leaders

References

Sources
Baseball Library

1933 births
2002 deaths
People from Remedios, Cuba
California Angels players
Major League Baseball pitchers
Major League Baseball players from Cuba
Cuban expatriate baseball players in the United States
Hawaii Islanders players
Artesia Giants players
Tacoma Giants players
El Paso Sun Kings players
Fresno Giants players
Seattle Angels players
People with tetraplegia